Héctor Guerrero (24 November 1926 – 20 July 1986) was a Mexican basketball player. He competed in the men's tournament at the 1948 Summer Olympics and the 1952 Summer Olympics.

References

1926 births
1986 deaths
Basketball players from Chihuahua
Mexican men's basketball players
Olympic basketball players of Mexico
Basketball players at the 1948 Summer Olympics
Basketball players at the 1951 Pan American Games
Basketball players at the 1952 Summer Olympics
Place of birth missing
Pan American Games competitors for Mexico